The silverband shiner (Notropis shumardi) is a species of ray-finned fish in the genus Notropis. It is endemic to the United States, where it is found in the Mississippi River and main tributaries in lower Ohio, Arkansas, Louisiana to Illinois and South Dakota, and several Gulf slope drainages.

References 

 

Notropis
Taxa named by Charles Frédéric Girard
Fish described in 1856